1,8-Octanediol, also known as octamethylene glycol, is a diol with the molecular formula HO(CH)OH.  1,8-Octanediol is a white solid.  It is produced by hydrogenation of esters of suberic acid.

1,8-Octanediol is used as a monomer in the synthesis of some polymers such as polyesters and polyurethanes. 

As with other fatty alcohols, octane-1,8-diol is used in cosmetics as an emollient and humectant.

See also
Ethylene glycol
1,2-Octanediol

References

Monomers
Alkanediols